SCR Model School is a private school located in Ashok Vihar Phase 3, Gurgaon, Haryana, India, and founded by Late Shri Chandi Ram Kataria.

History
The school is affiliated to the Central Board of Secondary Education and was founded in 1999 by Chandi Ram Kataria. It has about 1000 students and more than 60 teachers. The school has facilities like canteen, transport, play area, swimming pool, auditorium.

SCR Group of Schools 
 SCR Public School - located at Street Number 3, Sheetla Colony Phase 2, Gurugram, Haryana 122017
 SCR Model School - located at Block J, Ashok Vihar Phase III, Gurugram, Haryana 122017
 SCR Global School - located at Block C 1, Palam Vihar, Gurugram, Haryana 122017

See also
Education in India
Literacy in India  
List of institutions of higher education in Haryana

References

External links

Private schools in Haryana
Schools in Gurgaon